Sherwood is a manufacturer of hi-fi equipment.

The company was founded 1953 in Chicago.

The company is currently under Inkel Corporation of South Korea, one of the largest AV receivers manufacturers in the world.

External links 
 Sherwood America
 Sherwood Electronics Europe GmbH
 Inkel in South Korea, Brand owner of Sherwood
 Sherwood Audio Video, old website for product information only

Audio amplifier manufacturers
Audio equipment manufacturers of the United States
Audio equipment manufacturers of South Korea
Electronics companies established in 1953
South Korean brands
Consumer electronics brands
1953 establishments in Illinois